Luís Jorge Sá Silva (born 23 August 1990 in Benguela) is an Angolan racing driver. 
He competes under a Macanese competition licence, as the Angolan motorsport federation (FADM — Federação Angolana de Desportos Motorizados) is not recognised by the FIA to issue the Grade A competition license that he requires.

Career

Asian Formula Renault
Luís Sá Silva contested the Asian Formula Renault Challenge series from 2007 until 2009. During the 2009 season, he won six races and started from pole four times, ultimately finishing in second place overall.

Formula Pilota China
After a short spell contesting Formula Three championships in Europe throughout 2010, Sá Silva returned to Asia for the Formula Pilota China series in 2011. Sá Silva recorded two wins and three podiums to finish second overall, some sixty-five points behind series winner Mathéo Tuscher.

Formula 3
In 2012, Sá Silva returned to Europe to begin a widespread Formula Three campaign that included the Formula 3 Euro Series, the Macau Grand Prix and Masters of Formula 3, and guest appearances in the British Formula 3 Championship. Driving a Dallara chassis powered by a Mercedes-Benz engine that was prepared by the Prema Powerteam, Sá Silva endured a difficult season, in which he scored just fourteen points in the Euro Series, with a best result of seventh place at the Nürburgring.

At the Masters of Formula 3 in July, Sá Silva qualified eighteenth, and went on to finish the race in the same position, four laps behind race winner Daniel Juncadella. His appearance at the Macau Grand Prix was equally difficult; after qualifying twenty-seventh out of thirty drivers, he went on to finish the Qualifying Race in twenty-third position, and was involved in a collision with Dennis van de Laar on the final lap of the Main Race. As he had completed 90% of the race winner's distance at the time of the collision, Sá Silva was considered to have completed the race, and was classified in twenty-third place.

As a guest driver in the British Formula 3 championship, Sá Silva was ineligible to score championship points when he raced at the Norisring and Spa-Francorchamps. However, his results—with a best place of fifteenth in the first race at the Norisring—would not have seen him score points had he been eligible to record them.

GP3 Series (2013/2014)
Sá Silva competed at the GP3 Series with Carlin in 2013 and 2014.

Racing record

Career summary

‡ Position when season was cancelled.

Notes:
 — Points are not awarded for the Macau Grand Prix or Masters of Formula 3.
 — Sá Silva was a guest driver ineligible to score points.

Complete GP3 Series results
(key) (Races in bold indicate pole position) (Races in italics indicate fastest lap)

† Driver did not finish the race, but was classified as he completed over 90% of the race distance.

Complete Auto GP results
(key) (Races in bold indicate pole position) (Races in italics indicate fastest lap)

‡ Position when season was cancelled.

References

External links
 
 
 

1990 births
Living people
People from Benguela
Angolan racing drivers
Formula Renault 2.0 NEC drivers
Formula 3 Euro Series drivers
Formula Masters China drivers
British Formula Three Championship drivers
FIA Formula 3 European Championship drivers
GP3 Series drivers
Auto GP drivers
Carlin racing drivers
Asian Formula Renault Challenge drivers
Asia Racing Team drivers
Prema Powerteam drivers
Motopark Academy drivers
German Formula Three Championship drivers
Austrian Formula Three Championship drivers